Alberto Alari (born 21 September 1999) is an Italian football player who plays as a centre back for Dolomiti Bellunesi.

Club career

Atalanta
He is a product of Atalanta youth teams and played for their Under-19 squad beginning in the 2016–17 season.

Loan to Carrarese
On 6 July 2018, Alari joined to Serie C club Carrarese on a season-long loan. On 29 October he made his professional debut in Serie C for Carrarese, as a starter, in a 0–0 away draw against Pontedera, he was replaced by Giacomo Rosaia after 86 minutes. Five days later, on 4 November, he played his first entire match for the team, a 3–0 home win over Albissola. Alari ended his season-long loan to Carrarese with only 5 appearances, including 4 entire matches and all as a starter, however he remain an unused substitute 36 times during this season at Carrarese.

Loan to Südtirol 
On 12 July 2019, Alari was loaned to Serie C side Südtirol on a season-long loan deal. On 25 September he made his debut for the club as a substitute replacing Daniele Casiraghi in the 83rd minute of a 3–0 home win over Fermana. On 1 December he played his first match as a starter for the club, a 1–0 home defeat against Vicenza Virtus, he was replaced by Niccolò Romero in the 82nd minute. Two weeks later, on 15 December, he played his first entire match for the club, a 2–0 home defeat against Piacenza. Alari ended his season-long loan to Südtirol with only 6 appearances, however he remained an unused substitute for 25 other matches.

Loan to Ravenna 
On 5 September 2020, Alari was signed by Serie C club Ravenna on a season-long loan deal.  Three weeks later, on 27 September, he made his debut for the club in a 2–1 home defeat against Südtirol, he played the entire match. He became Ravenna's first-choice early in the season. Alari ended his season-long loan to Ravenna with 31 appearances, including 26 of them as a starter, however Ravenna was relegated after having lose 4–0 on aggregate in the play-out against Legnago Salus, he played only the return match as a substitute.

Loan to Pergolettese 
On 11 July 2021, Alari joined Pergolettese in Serie C on loan for the 2021–22 season.

Serie D
On 21 July 2022, Alari signed with Serie D club Dolomiti Bellunesi.

International career
He was first called up to represent his country in February 2017, for an Italy national under-18 football team friendly. He was later called up into the Under-19 and Under 20 squads, also for friendlies.

Career statistics

Club

References

External links
 

1999 births
Living people
People from Calcinate
Sportspeople from the Province of Bergamo
Footballers from Lombardy
Italian footballers
Association football defenders
Serie C players
Atalanta B.C. players
Carrarese Calcio players
F.C. Südtirol players
Ravenna F.C. players
U.S. Pergolettese 1932 players
Italy youth international footballers